Senegal is a multilingual country: Ethnologue lists 36 languages, Wolof being the most widely spoken language.

French, which was inherited from the colonial era. It is used by the administration and understood by about 15–20% of all men and about 1–2% of all women. Senegal is a member State of the Organisation internationale de la Francophonie. A Senegalese, Abdou Diouf, held the position of its Executive Secretary between 2003 and 2014.

Several of the Senegalese languages have the status of "national languages": Wolof, Balanta-Ganja, Arabic, Jola-Fonyi, Mandinka, Mandjak, Mankanya, Noon (Serer-Noon), Pulaar, Serer, and Soninke.

In terms of usage, Wolof is the lingua franca and the most widely spoken language in Senegal, as a first or second language (80%).

Mande languages spoken include Soninke, and Mandinka. Jola (Diola) is a main language in the Casamance region. The Guinea Creole dialect, based on Portuguese is also spoken in that region.  In 2008 Senegal, due to its historical connections to Portuguese colonisation in Casamance, was admitted as Associate Observer in the CPLP (Community of Portuguese Language Countries).

Education for the deaf in Senegal uses American Sign Language, introduced by the deaf American missionary Andrew Foster.  A local language is Mbour Sign Language.

A report for the High Council of Francophonie in Paris stated in 1986 that in Senegal, 60,000 people spoke French as a first language and 700,000 spoke French as a second language. The total population of Senegal at the time was 6,500,000.

Languages taught at school
French is a mandatory school subject, as it is the official language of Senegal. English is taught as a subject in secondary school across the country.

Languages 
Arabic
 American Sign Language
 Badyara
 Banyum
 Balanta
 Bandial
 Bassari
 Bayot
 Bedik
 Guinea-Bissau Creole
French
 Fula
 Gusilay
 Mauritanian Arabic
 Jola-Felupe
 Jola-Fonyi
 Kasa
 Karon
 Kassonke
 Kobiana
 Kwatay
 Laalaa
 Mandinka
 Manjak
 Maninka
 Mankanya
 Mbouti Sign Language
 Mlomp
 Ndut
 Nko
 Noon
 Palor
 Pulaar
 Pular
 Safen
 Serer
 Soninke
 Wamey
 Wolof
 Yalunka

References

Further reading
 Dumont, Pierre (1982). Le français et les langues africaines au Sénégal. Paris: AACT and Karthala.

External links

Linguistic map of Senegal at Muturzikin.com
Local language resources from Peace Corps Senegal
Ethnologue page on Senegal
PanAfrican L10n page on Senegal
Linguistic situation in Senegal (In French)